SM U-29 or U-XXIX was a U-27 class U-boat or submarine for the Austro-Hungarian Navy. U-29, built by the Hungarian firm of Ganz Danubius at Fiume, was launched in October 1916 and commissioned in January 1917.

She displaced nearly  when surfaced and over  when submerged. She was armed with two bow torpedo tubes and could carry a load of up to four torpedoes. She was also equipped with a  deck gun and a machine gun.

During her service career, U-29 sank three ships and damaged one warship, sending a combined tonnage of 14,784 to the bottom. U-29 was at Fiume at war's end and was surrendered at Venice in March 1919. She was granted to France as war reparation in 1920, but foundered while under tow to Bizerta for scrapping.

Design and construction 

After these steps alleviated their most urgent needs, the Austro-Hungarian Navy selected the German Type UB II design for its newest submarines in mid 1915. The Germans were reluctant to allocate any of their wartime resources to Austro-Hungarian construction, but were willing to sell plans for up to six of the UB II boats to be constructed under license in Austria-Hungary. The Navy agreed to the proposal and purchased the plans from AG Weser of Bremen.

U-29 displaced  surfaced and  submerged. She was capable of  while surfaced and  while submerged. U-27-class boats were designed for a crew of 23–24.

U-29 was armed with two  bow torpedo tubes and could carry a complement of four torpedoes. She was also equipped with a 75 mm/26 (3.0 in) deck gun and an  machine gun.

After intricate political negotiations to allocate production of the class between Austrian and Hungarian firms, U-27 was ordered from Ganz Danubius on 12 October 1915. She was laid down on 3 March 1916 at Fiume and launched on 21 October.

Service career 
U-29 underwent diving trials at Fiume and then made her way to Pola on 29 November 1916. There, on 21 January 1917, SM U-29 was commissioned into the Austro-Hungarian Navy under the command of Linienschiffleutnant Leo Prásil.

U-29 departed on her first patrol on 23 January, destined for duty in the Mediterranean. The next day, however, the U-boat encountered a severe storm near Lussin that damaged her. Prásil steered the boat into the harbor at Brgulje to wait out the storm. Departing Brgulje on the 25th to resume her journey to the Mediterranean, the submarine developed a leak when performing a test dive. U-29 headed back to Pula for repairs, which lasted until 30 January. On 5 February the U-boat set out for Cattaro, which she reached after three days journey.

Prásil took U-29 out of Cattaro on 17 February to begin the delayed patrol in the Mediterranean, but on the 20th encountered another severe storm. Suffering no damage in the tempest, the boat continued on. On 1 March the U-boat's gyrocompass broke down, necessitating a return to port. Two days later, as she neared Cattaro, U-29 encountered yet another storm, this one again damaging the ship. The beleaguered U-boat headed back to the base at Pula for more repairs, and remained there until early April.

On 4 April, U-29 set out from Pula, touched at Cattaro, and continued on into the Mediterranean for her second patrol there. While  from Cape Matapan, Prásil torpedoed and sank the steamer Dalton, traveling in ballast. U-29 took the master of the 3,486 GRT British ship captive; three other men lost their lives in the attack. The ship, en route from Calcutta to London with a general cargo, was finished off by U-29s deck gun. As with Dalton, Mashobras master was taken prisoner. Eight persons died in the attack. U-29s gyrocompass broke down again on 17 April, once again forcing the boat to return for repairs. U-29s second Mediterranean tour ended when Prásil docked the boat at Cattaro on 19 April.

U-29s third Mediterranean deployment began on 8 May when she departed Cattaro. After eleven days at sea, Prásil torpedoed the British cargo ship Mordenwood  from Cape Matapan. U-29 took the 3,125 GRT ship's master captive. Two sources disagree on the number of casualties when Mordenwood went down, but place the number at either 21 or 31. Escorting destroyers launched a depth charge attack on U-29 but did not succeed in damaging the U-boat. Two days later, U-29 launched a torpedo attack on the British steamer Marie Suzanne but did not sink the ship. U-29 arrived at Cattaro on 25 May.

After a brief time in port, U-29 set out for the Mediterranean again on 17 June. One day out, the U-boat came under attack from an airplane out of Valona, compelling U-29 to crash dive; none of the three bombs dropped by the aircraft hit their mark. U-29s patrol ended without success when she docked at Cattaro on 6 July. After a return to Pola on 12 July, the U-boat underwent extensive repairs that kept her out of action for the next nine months.

On 16 March 1918, the newly refitted boat sailed from Pola to Cattaro, departing that port for another Mediterranean tour on 25 March. Near Valona the next day, an Italian destroyer attempted to ram U-29, scraping one of her propellers against U-29s conning tower. The damage done was slight and U-29 continued on into the Mediterranean, weathering a storm in the Ionian Sea on the 27th. On 4 April, U-29 launched a torpedo attack on what was thought to be a cargo ship. In fact, it was the British protected cruiser  which had been hit. Edgar was damaged but did not sink; she suffered no casualties in the attack. The following day Prásil attempted to torpedo a ship in a convoy but missed and was exposed to a depth charge attack by the convoy's escorts. The U-boat ended the patrol with no further successes.

In June, the Austro-Hungarian Navy planned an assault on the Otranto Barrage, similar to a May 1917 action that evolved into the Battle of Otranto Straits. U-29 was deployed from Cattaro on 9 June in advance of the attack. Szent István was hit and sank just after 06:00, and the entire operation was called off. U-29 returned to Cattaro on 12 June. Over the next two months, U-29 operated in the Adriatic out of Cattaro, patrolling off Durazzo and the Albanian coast.

While at Cattaro, command of U-29 passed to Linienschiffleutnant Friedrich Sterz on 4 September. The 27-year-old native of Pergine, Tyrolia (in present-day Italy), had previously commanded  and, like Prásil, had also served a stint as commander of U-10. After assuming command of U-29, Sterz set sail for Durazzo the same day. The U-boat had encounters with MAS torpedo boats on 9 and 12 September. On the latter date, U-29 had to crash dive to avoid a bombing attack from Allied airplanes. None of the seven bombs hit their mark and U-29 returned to Cattaro on 16 September.

Linienschiffleutnant Robert Dürrigl replaced Sterz as commander on 29 September. The Galician Dürrial, like both Stertz and Prásil, had served as the commander of U-10, but had most recently commanded . A day after assuming command, Dürrial headed for the Albanian coast in U-29 and patrolled off Durazzo.

After the Armistice with Bulgaria on 29 September ended Bulgaria's participation in the war, Durazzo gained importance to the remaining Central Powers as the main port for supplying their forces fighting in the Balkans. Anticipating this, the Allies put together a force to bombard Durazzo. While the second echelon of the attacking force got into position to bombard the town, U-29 and sister boat  maneuvered to attack. While U-31 was able to hit and damage the British cruiser , U-29 was blocked by screening ships and herself attacked. The Allied escorts (mainly American submarine chasers) subjected U-29 to a heavy depth charge attack. U-29 was able to make her way back to Cattaro on 8 October.

Over the next three weeks, U-29 patrolled between Cattaro and Antivari, Montenegro. There she remained until she was awarded to France as a war reparation in 1920. In total, U-29 sank three ships with a combined tonnage of 14,784, and damaged one warship.

Summary of raiding history

Notes 

3. Josef Guenther Lettenmaier, who served on U 29 as "Maschinenquartiermeister", roughly equivalent to Machinist Mate 2nd Class, documented his experiences in the Austro-Hungarian Navy and aboard U 29 as historical fiction in "Rot-Weiss-Rot zur See", published by Tyrolia Verlag, Innsbruck, 1934. Lettenmaier's book is the only published record of the K.u.k. U-Waffe written by "other ranks".

References

Bibliography 

 
 
 
 
 
 

U-27-class submarines (Austria-Hungary)
U-boats commissioned in 1917
1916 ships
World War I submarines of Austria-Hungary
Ships built in Fiume